Lawrence Timmerman may refer to:
 Lawrence J. Timmerman (1878–1959), American politician and lawyer
 Lawrence W. Timmerman (1910–2003), his son, member of the Wisconsin State Assembly